Westbury Street Holdings (WSH) is an English contract catering company.

WSH was founded in 2000 by Alastair Storey, who is the company's chairman and chief executive (CEO).

WSH owns BaxterStorey, Portico, Caterlink, Holroyd Howe, Benugo and Searcys, and its headquarters, WSH International Investments Limited, is in Reading, Berkshire.

In 2014, WSH acquired Searcys for an undisclosed sum, although it was marketed at £25-30 million.

References

Companies based in Reading, Berkshire
Catering and food service companies of the United Kingdom
2000 establishments in England
British companies established in 2000
Service companies of England
Food and drink companies established in 2000